Evergreen Terrace is an American metalcore band.

Evergreen Terrace may also refer to:

Evergreen Terrace, Washington, an unincorporated community
Evergreen Terrace, a fictional street on The Simpsons that is the location of The Simpsons house